Hiyy Halaaku (English translation: Heartbreak) is a 2000 Maldivian romantic drama film directed by Hussain Adil. Produced under Motion Pictures, the film stars Yoosuf Shafeeu, Niuma Mohamed and Sheela Najeeb and Niuma Mohamed in pivotal roles. The plot combines two love triangles set years apart. The first half covers friends on a college campus, while the second tells the story of a widower's young daughter who tries to reunite her dad with his old friend. The film was an unofficial remake of Karan Johar's romantic drama film Kuch Kuch Hota Hai (1998).

Premise
The film opens showing the strong bond between Shahil (Yoosuf Shafeeu) and his best friend, tomboy Fazlee (Niuma Mohamed) who are popular students at college. Although they are very close, both of them deny any romantic feelings for each other. They are then introduced to the college principal Mr. Shameel's (Ali Shameel) daughter Zeena (Sheela Najeeb) who joined the college from Oxford University to finish her degree. Zeena quickly becomes friends with Shahil and Fazlee while Shahil constantly flirts with Zeena, trying to win over her. As times fly by, Fazlee realises her true affection towards Shahil but before she is able to declare her feelings, she discovers that Shahil is in love with Zeena.

Cast 
 Yoosuf Shafeeu as Shahil Hannan
 Niuma Mohamed as Fazlee Shareef
 Sheela Najeeb as Zeena Saleem
 Ibrahim Giyas as Aiman
 Sheleen as Aminath Fazlee
 Fauziyya Hassan as Shahil's mother
 Arifa Ibrahim as Fazlee's mother
 Ali Shameel as Saleem
 Neena Saleem as Ms. Sharafiyya
 Hussain Shibau as Albeyla
 Amjad Ibrahim as Fathimath Shifa's parent
 Suneetha Ali (special appearance in the song "Thiya Loabi Handhaanveema")

Soundtrack

References

2000 films
Maldivian romantic drama films
Remakes of Maldivian films
2000 romantic drama films
Dhivehi-language films